Knowles is a town in Beaver County, Oklahoma, United States.  The population was 11 at the 2010 census.

The Knowles Grain Elevator is on the National Register of Historic Places listings in Beaver County, Oklahoma.

Geography
Knowles is located at  (36.873697, -100.192888).

Knowles is served by US Route 64.

Demographics

As of the census of 2000, there were 32 people, 10 households, and 8 families residing in the town. There were 11 housing units at an average density of 62.0 per square mile (23.6/km2). The racial makeup of the town was 90.62% White, 9.38% from other races. Hispanic or Latino of any race were 25.00% of the population.

There were 10 households, out of which 50.0% had children under the age of 18 living with them, 70.0% were married couples living together, 10.0% had a female householder with no husband present, and 20.0% were non-families. 20.0% of all households were made up of individuals, and none had someone living alone who was 65 years of age or older. The average household size was 3.20 and the average family size was 3.75.

In the town, the population was spread out, with 37.5% under the age of 18, 18.8% from 18 to 24, 9.4% from 25 to 44, 25.0% from 45 to 64, and 9.4% who were 65 years of age or older. The median age was 24 years. For every 100 females, there were 100.0 males. For every 100 females age 18 and over, there were 81.8 males.

The median income for a household in the town was $24,583, and the median income for a family was $43,750. Males had a median income of $25,000 versus $20,833 for females. The per capita income for the town was $11,887. There were 33.3% of families and 43.5% of the population living below the poverty line, including 62.5% of those under 18 and none of those over 64.

References

Towns in Beaver County, Oklahoma
Towns in Oklahoma
Oklahoma Panhandle